Miguel Vargas (born 8 November 1957) is a Costa Rican long-distance runner. He competed in the men's 10,000 metres at the 1992 Summer Olympics.

References

1957 births
Living people
Athletes (track and field) at the 1991 Pan American Games
Athletes (track and field) at the 1992 Summer Olympics
Costa Rican male long-distance runners
Olympic athletes of Costa Rica
Place of birth missing (living people)
Central American Games gold medalists for Costa Rica
Central American Games medalists in athletics
Pan American Games competitors for Costa Rica
21st-century Costa Rican people
20th-century Costa Rican people